The men's 110 metres hurdles event at the 1982 Commonwealth Games was held on 3 and 4 October at the QE II Stadium in Brisbane, Australia.

Medalists

Results

Heats
Qualification: First 4 in each heat (Q) and the next 1 fastest (q) qualify for the final.

Wind:Heat 1: +2.2 m/s, Heat 2: +2.4 m/s

Final
Wind: +1.9 m/s

References

Heats results (The Sydney Morning Herald)
Final results (The Sydney Morning Herald)
Final results (The Canberra Times)
Australian results 

Athletics at the 1982 Commonwealth Games
1982